Stea is a surname. Notable people with the surname include:

 Kevin Stea (born 1969), American dancer, choreographer, actor, singer, director, and model
 Cesare Stea (1893–1960), American sculptor